Joanna Lenko (born April 24, 1992) is a Canadian retired ice dancer. She won three medals on the ISU Junior Grand Prix series with Mitchell Islam.

Personal life
Lenko was born in Meadow Lake, Saskatchewan. Her sister is fellow skater Kristina Lenko.

Career
From 2000 through 2008, Lenko competed with Mitchell Islam. They trained at the Mariposa School of Skating, coached by Mitchell Islam's father, David.

In the 2006–07 ISU Junior Grand Prix season, Lenko/Islam were 5th in the Netherlands and won a silver medal in Hungary. After taking silver on the junior level at the 2007 Canadian Championships, they were assigned to the 2007 World Junior Championships but withdrew after the original dance due to Lenko's illness.

Lenko/Islam won a pair of medals in the 2007–08 ISU Junior Grand Prix — silver in the U.S. and bronze in Estonia — which qualified the team for the 2007 JGP Final. Health issues forced them to withdraw prior to the event. They were also unable to compete at the 2008 Canadian Championships, where they had intended to skate at the senior level for the first time. Despite missing the event, Skate Canada named them to the 2008 Junior World team. However, Lenko's health issues persisted, leaving them unable to compete at the event.

Lenko teamed up with Jason Cheperdak in 2009, and the skaters began to train in Pennsylvania with coaches Natalia Linichuk and Gennadi Karponosov.  Lenko was forced to retire from the sport in 2010 due to returning health issues, finally being diagnosed with Lyme disease.

Competitive highlights
(with Islam)

Programs

References

External links

 
 

1992 births
Canadian female ice dancers
Living people
Sportspeople from Meadow Lake, Saskatchewan